Antonio Albacete (born 15 January 1965) is a Spanish racing driver. He competed in Formula 3000 in 1987 and spent three years in Spanish Touring Cars, from 1994 until 1996. During his stay in the latter he drove for three different manufacturers – Opel, then BMW, and finally Alfa Romeo. In 1998 he drove for the first time in the European Truck Championship.
In 2005, 2006 and 2010 he won the European Truck Championship for the CEPSA-MAN team managed by Spanish Ivan Cruz.

Racing record

FIA European Truck Racing

 2003 4th FIA European Truck Racing Championship
 2004 4th FIA European Truck Racing Championship
 2005 Winner FIA European Truck Racing Championship
 2006 Winner FIA European Truck Racing Championship
 2007 2nd FIA European Truck Racing Championship
 2008 3rd FIA European Truck Racing Championship
 2009 2nd FIA European Truck Racing Championship
 2010 Winner FIA European Truck Racing Championship
 2011 2nd FIA European Truck Racing Championship
 2012 2nd FIA European Truck Racing Championship
 2013 2nd FIA European Truck Racing Championship
 2014 3rd FIA European Truck Racing Championship
 2015 5th FIA European Truck Racing Championship
 2017 5th FIA European Truck Racing Championship
 2018 3rd FIA European Truck Racing Championship
 2019 2nd FIA European Truck Racing Championship
 2021 5th FIA European Truck Racing Championship
 2022 5th FIA European Truck Racing Championship

Complete International Formula 3000 results
(key) (Races in bold indicate pole position) (Races in italics indicate fastest lap)

External links
 Página oficial de la FIA sobre el Campeonato de Europa de Camiones
 TruckRace.es European Truck Racing Championship not official website (ETRC). In Spanish.
 FCOM Seguimiento de la temporada 2009 del ETRC.

1965 births
Spanish racing drivers
Living people
International Formula 3000 drivers
British Formula 3000 Championship drivers
Sportspeople from Madrid

Teo Martín Motorsport drivers